Oriana was a  tug which was built in 1945 as Empire Frieda by Ferguson Brothers (Port Glasgow) Ltd., Port Glasgow, Renfrewshire, United Kingdom for the Ministry of War Transport (MoWT). Ownership was transferred to the Ministry of Transport in 1946 and the Admiralty in 1947, when she was renamed Oriana. She struck a mine and sank in the River Colne, Essex on 19 January 1948 with the loss of all on deck.

Description

The engine was built by Ferguson Brother (Port Glasgow) Ltd. It drove a single screw propeller.

History
Empire Freetown was built in 1945 as yard number 377 by Ferguson Brothers (Port Glasgow) Co. Ltd., Port Glasgow, Renfrewshire for the Ministry of War Transport (MoWT). She was launched on 22 October 1945 and completed on 31 January 1946. Her port of registry was Glasgow. The United Kingdom Official Number 169463 and Code Letters GFDP were allocated. She was operated under the management of the Overseas Towageand Salvage Co. Ltd, London.

The MoWT became the Ministry of Transport in April 1946. She was passed to the Admiralty on 31 May 1947 and renamed Oriana. On 19 January 1948, with the French tug Vagrant, she was towing HMMS 366 from Chatham Dockyard to Brightlingsea, Essex when she struck a mine and sank in the Colne Estuary with the loss of all fifteen of her crew, who all hailed from the Medway Towns, Kent.

References

1945 ships
Ships built on the River Clyde
Empire ships
Ministry of War Transport ships
Steamships of the United Kingdom
Tugboats of the United Kingdom
Maritime incidents in 1948
Ships sunk by mines